Roanoke City Firehouse No. 6 is a historic fire station located in the Belmont neighborhood of Roanoke, Virginia.  It was built in 1911, and is a two-story, three bay, hipped-roof building.  It was built to resemble an early-20th century American Foursquare dwelling embellished with Classical Revival details.

It was listed on the National Register of Historic Places in 1991.

References

Fire stations completed in 1911
Government buildings completed in 1911
Fire stations on the National Register of Historic Places in Virginia
Neoclassical architecture in Virginia
Buildings and structures in Roanoke, Virginia
National Register of Historic Places in Roanoke, Virginia
1911 establishments in Virginia